Imre Szalay (1905–1942) was a Hungarian wrestler. He competed in the men's Greco-Roman light heavyweight at the 1928 Summer Olympics.

References

External links
 

1905 births
1942 deaths
Hungarian male sport wrestlers
Olympic wrestlers of Hungary
Wrestlers at the 1928 Summer Olympics
Martial artists from Budapest